Mais Barkhudarov is an Azerbaijani officer, lieutenant general of Armed Forces of Azerbaijan, who was a participant of 2016 Nagorno-Karabakh clashes and 2020 Nagorno-Karabakh war. He is the current commander of the 2nd Army Corps of Azerbaijan.

Biography 
Mais Barkhudarov was born in Qubadli, Azerbaijan SSR. Since childhood he was fond of wrestling. He was taught by wrestler Aliyar Aliyev, who later participated in the first Karabakh war and became a National Hero of Azerbaijan (posthumously). Events unfolding in those years in Karabakh led Barkhudarov in the Jamshid Nakhchivanski Military Lyceum.

Head of the lyceum General Valeh Barshadly (former minister of defense of Azerbaijan) influenced Barkhudarov in the years of study there. In 1993, together with a group of students Barkhudarov decided to voluntarily go to the front. Upon learning about this, Barshadly summoned the students, dissuaded them from this step, and persuaded to continue their education.

In 1998, senior lieutenant Barkhudarov was awarded the Order of "Azerbaijani flag". President Heydar Aliyev personally presented him this award. In 2012, for a special service in the preservation of the independence and territorial integrity of Azerbaijan and for the distinction in the line of duty and the tasks assigned to the military unit, Barkhudarov was awarded with the medal "For Homeland".

On the night from 1 to 2 April 2016, Armenian–Azerbaijani clashes took place along the line of contact in Nagorno-Karabakh and surrounding territories to the south. On 5 April, a mutual ceasefire agreement was reached. During the clashes, Colonel Barkhudarov participated in the capture of the height Lalatapa. Since the beginning of the fighting, he personally got into the tank and rushed into the fight in the first line of attack. According to eyewitnesses, the corps commander's gesture inspired the soldiers, forcing the fight with extreme activity. According to an Azerbaijani news portal, Mais Barkhudarov destroyed numerous Armenians’ forces however officer had limited forces.

On 19 April 2016, Azerbaijani President Ilham Aliyev signed orders on awarding honorary titles, orders and medals to a group of Azerbaijani military servicemen who "have distinguished exceptional bravery and heroism while preventing the Armenian military provocations on the contact line of troops and repelling the enemy's attacks on civilians from April 2 to 5". Mais Barkhudarov has been awarded with the rank of major general by President Aliyev because of his personally participation in the military operation of capture of Lalatapa. Barkhudarov is the first officer who was awarded with this rank by President for heroism during the last 20 years.

Barkhudarov is currently a unit commander. On 4 October, the Supreme Commander-in-Chief of the Armed Forces of Azerbaijan, and President of Azerbaijan Ilham Aliyev congratulated him, as well as the Commander of the Special Forces, then Major General Hikmat Mirzayev, and the personnel led by them on the liberation of the city of Jabrayil and nine villages of Jabrayil District during the Second Nagorno-Karabakh war. On 9 December, President Aliyev signed a decree to award Barkhudarov with the Karabakh Order.

References 

People from Qubadlı
Living people
1976 births
Azerbaijani generals
Azerbaijani military personnel
2016 Nagorno-Karabakh clashes
Azerbaijani Land Forces personnel of the 2020 Nagorno-Karabakh war